Trinity County is a county located in the northwestern portion of the U.S. state of California. Trinity County is rugged, mountainous, heavily forested, and lies along the Trinity River (for which it is named) within the Salmon and Klamath Mountains. It is also one of three counties in California with no incorporated cities (the other two counties in California with that distinction are Alpine and Mariposa counties).

As of the 2020 census, the population was 16,112, making it the fifth least-populous county in California, and the least-populous of California's 27 original counties. The county seat and largest community is Weaverville.

History
Trinity County has a rich history of Native Americans: Tsnungwe including the South Fork Hupa and tł'oh-mitah-xwe,  Chimariko, and Wintu.

The county takes its name from the Trinity River, which was in turn named in 1845 by Major Pierson B. Reading, who was under the mistaken impression that the river emptied into Trinidad Bay. Trinity is the English translation of Trinidad.

Trinity County was one of the original counties of California, created in 1850 at the time of statehood. Parts of the county were ceded to Klamath County in 1852 and to Humboldt County in 1853.

Geography
The county contains a significant portion of Shasta-Trinity National Forest and the Trinity Alps Wilderness—the second largest wilderness in California.

Trinity County is made up of five census tracts. Census Tract 1.01 includes the communities of Douglas City, Lewiston, Trinity Center, and part of Coffee Creek and Weaverville. Notable features are Trinity Dam and Lake, Lewiston Dam and Lake, the Trinity River, and the Lewiston Valley. It has a population of 2585 people in 550 square miles, leading to a population density of 4.7 people per square mile. Census Tract 1.02 includes most of Weaverville and Coffee Creek. It is the most populous census tract in the county, with 4558 people. It has 449 square miles, leading to a population density of 10.2 people per square mile. Notable features are the Weaver Basin, the Trinity Alps, Scott Mountain, and the upper Trinity River. Census Tract 2 includes the Downriver area of Trinity County. This means the communities of Junction City, Big Flat, Big Bar, Burnt Ranch, Hawkins Bar, and Salyer. It includes 2024 people, and notable features are the Trinity River, the Trinity Alps, and the New River. Census Tract 3 includes the communities of Hayfork, Hyampom, and Wildwood. It has 3105 people in 600 square miles, leading to a population density of 5.2 people per square mile. Notable features are the South Fork of the Trinity River, South Fork Mountain, Hayfork Valley, Hyampom Valley, Chanchellula Peak, and Hayfork Bally. Census Tract 4 is the largest by area but the least populous census tract in the county with 975 people. It contains 833 square miles, leading to a population density of 1.2 people per square mile. The largest community by far is Mad River, with other smaller ones being Ruth, Kettenpom, and Zenia. Notable features include South Fork Mountain, the Mad River, the Van Duzen River, Ruth Lake, Ruth Valley, Kettenpom Valley, and Hoaglin Valley.

The county hosts many visitors, especially during summer months, for camping, backpacking, boating on the lakes, rafting/kayaking on the rivers, hunting, and fishing. The summers tend to be clear, sunny, warm, and very dry, with little rain from June to September except for some mountain thunderstorms in the highest elevations. Summer days in the populated areas of the county range from 90 to 97 degrees, and summer nights range from 45 to 55. Winter days range from 40 to 50, and nights range from 25 to 35. The winters tend to have copious precipitation, increasing with elevation and falling mostly as rain under 1000m/3300 ft in the valley bottoms, and mostly as snow over 1000m/3300 ft on the mountainsides. December, January, and February are the wettest. The precipitation ranges from 30 to 35 inches at low elevations isolated from coastal influence, such as Big Bar, Hayfork, and Weaverville, up to 55 or 60 inches at high elevations, on the coastal side of South Fork Mountain, or where gaps in the mountain allow for precipitation to get through. Examples of this last phenomenon include Salyer and Forest Glen. Kalmia Lake, at nearly 7500 feet in the Canyon Creek area of the Trinity Alps, is reputed to be the snowiest place in California, outpacing Lake Helen in Mount Lassen National Park, which receives 600-700 inches of snow each winter. Average snowfall in the populated parts of the county ranges from 0-5 inches in the lower Trinity Valley to at least 100 inches in places above 4000 feet, such as Indian Valley west of Hayfork.

The Klamath Mountains occupy the vast portion of the county.

Adjacent counties
 Siskiyou County - north
 Shasta County - east
 Tehama County - southeast
 Mendocino County - south
 Humboldt County - west

National protected areas
 Shasta-Trinity National Forest (part)
 Six Rivers National Forest (part)
 Mendocino National Forest (part)
 Shasta-Trinity National Recreation Area (part)
 Trinity Alps Wilderness (part)
 Yolla Bolly-Middle Eel Wilderness (part)

Climate
Trinity County has a mediterranean climate with very warm, dry and sunny summer days and high diurnal temperature variation due to the cool nights. The hot afternoons form a stark contrast to the mild coastal climates of Humboldt County relatively nearby. Winters are chilly and wet. Below is climate normals from county seat Weaverville. There are different microclimates in the county as elevations vary.

Politics 
Trinity was a Republican-leaning county in Presidential and congressional elections until recently; now it is a tossup. No Democrat had won the county since Jimmy Carter in 1976 until Barack Obama defeated John McCain by a 4% margin (50% to 46%) in 2008. In 2012, the county again voted Republican, but narrowly. Voter registration reflects this trend, with Democratic and Republican registration in a near dead heat (D: 2,710, R: 2,716). Third-party candidates tend to do rather well in Trinity County: George Wallace got over 13% of the county's vote in 1968, and it was the only California county carried by Ross Perot in 1992. It was also Perot's best performance in the state in 1996, although he didn't carry it again. John Anderson also did very well in 1980, as did third-party candidates in 2016.

Trinity County was the only California county where Obama won in 2008 and Joe Biden lost in 2020.

  
  
  
  
  
  
  
  
  
  
  
  
  
  
  
  
  
  
  
  
  
  
  
  
  
  
  
  
  
  
  
  

In 2010, Trinity County voted against Proposition 19, which would have taxed and regulated marijuana.

In 2016 Trinity County residents were asked again to vote on legalization of state-level recreational marijuana, facilitated by the Adult Use of Marijuana Act (AUMA), also known as California Proposition 64. The measure passed with 50.1% in favor of legalization. Statewide, the measure passed with 57.1% of the vote.

Voter registration statistics

Transportation

Major highways
 State Route 299
 State Route 3
 State Route 36

Public transportation

Trinity Transit provides weekday intercity bus service on State Routes 3 and 299, with connecting service in Willow Creek and Redding.  Service is also provided from Weaverville to Lewiston (MWF) and Hayfork (daily).

Airports
The county owns five general aviation airports: Trinity Center Airport, Weaverville Airport, Hayfork Airport, Hyampom Airport and Ruth Airport.

Crime 

The following table includes the number of incidents reported and the rate per 1,000 persons for each type of offense.

Demographics

2011

Places by population, race, and income

2010
The 2010 United States Census reported that Trinity County had a population of 13,786. The racial makeup of Trinity County was 12,033 (87.3%) White, 59 (0.4%) African American, 655 (4.8%) Native American, 94 (0.7%) Asian, 16 (0.1%) Pacific Islander, 217 (1.6%) from other races, and 712 (5.2%) from two or more races.  Hispanic or Latino of any race were 959 persons (7.0%).

2000

As of the census of 2000, there were 13,022 people, 5,587 households, and 3,625 families residing in the county.  The population density was 4 people per square mile (2/km2).  There were 7,980 housing units at an average density of 2 per square mile (1/km2).  The racial makeup of the county was 88.9% White, 0.5% Black or African American, 4.9% Native American, 0.5% Asian, 0.1% Pacific Islander, 0.9% from other races, and 4.4% from two or more races.  4.0% of the population were Hispanic or Latino of any race. 16.1% were of German, 13.4% English, 12.1% Irish and 9.5% American ancestry according to Census 2000. 97.3% spoke English and 1.8% Spanish as their first language.

There were 5,587 households, out of which 25.4% had children under the age of 18 living with them, 50.5% were married couples living together, 10.1% had a female householder with no husband present, and 35.1% were non-families. 29.5% of all households were made up of individuals, and 11.1% had someone living alone who was 65 years of age or older.  The average household size was 2.29 and the average family size was 2.80.

In the county, the population was spread out, with 22.8% under the age of 18, 5.1% from 18 to 24, 22.7% from 25 to 44, 32.1% from 45 to 64, and 17.2% who were 65 years of age or older.  The median age was 45 years. For every 100 females there were 104.2 males.  For every 100 females age 18 and over, there were 102.6 males.

The median income for a household in the county was $27,711, and the median income for a family was $34,343. Males had a median income of $31,131 versus $24,271 for females. The per capita income for the county was $16,868.  About 14.1% of families and 18.7% of the population were below the poverty line, including 26.2% of those under age 18 and 7.2% of those age 65 or over.

Communities

Census-designated places

Burnt Ranch is a small, rural community on Highway 299 in the Downriver area of the county. It lies above Burnt Ranch Gorge, a famed whitewater stretch of the Trinity River. The area around it is steep and forested, but there are many agricultural flats in the community proper. There is a volunteer fire department and an elementary school. The name either comes from a settler's ranch that was burned by Indians or an Indian camp that was burned by settlers. 
Coffee Creek is a small resort community on Highway 3 north of Trinity Lake. It sits where Coffee Creek meets the Trinity River. The community takes most of its economy from tourism, since it serves as the base camp for a popular trailhead into the Trinity Alps Wilderness. There are several guest ranches and resorts surrounding the community as well. It is home to a store, a pizza place, a campground and RV park, a church, and a fire department, as well as many guest accommodations in the surrounding area. 
Douglas City is a medium-sized community centered on Highway 299 and the Trinity River south of Weaverville. The homes are clustered around the river, although there are many elsewhere. The businesses in the town include a store, a fire department, and an elementary school. There are resorts and guest accommodations scattered along the river throughout the area. 
Hayfork is the second largest community in the county. It lies in the Hayfork Valley, the largest agricultural region in the county, and derives a significant part of the economy from ranching. It used to be a mill town as well until the closing of the Sierra Pacific mill in the 1990s due to reduced timber stocks, consolidation, and environmental regulations.
Hyampom is the only CDP along the South Fork Trinity River. It lies in the Hyampom Valley, one of the largest agricultural areas in the county, and one of the main economic drivers is vineyards. It sits at the foot of South Fork Mountain at the confluence of Hayfork Creek and the South Fork. The South Fork is one of the largest undammed watersheds in California, and provides critical habitat for salmon and steelhead, although the populations were decimated by the 1964 floods and are still slowly recovering. 
Junction City is the most populous and uppermost community in the Downriver area. It is marked by a large flat along the Trinity River covered in gravel from gold mining in the 19th century. It is located where Canyon Creek meets the river, and 15 miles up the creek lies the Canyon Creek Trailhead, the most popular trailhead into the Trinity Alps. The community's institutions consist of an elementary school, a store, a cafe, and a fire department. 
Lewiston is the third-largest community in the county. Prior to the Trinity River Project that built Trinity and Lewiston Dams, Lewiston was a small country crossroads, but during construction, a large community was built to house the workers and it stands to this day as the center of Trinity River recreation, including fly fishing, swimming, boating, and rafting. 
Mad River is one of two communities in the county not in the Trinity River watershed, the other being Ruth. It lies along the Mad River where Highway 36 crosses it. Unlike the north part of the county, Mad River is surrounded by rolling hills and mixed oak woodlands and Douglas fir forests. The businesses in the community include a church, a fire department, an elementary school, and a high school, one of three in the county. 
Post Mountain is on the north side of Highway 36, mainly in the valley of Post Creek. It was defined as a CDP for the 2020 census.
Ruth is the second community outside of the Trinity River basin, and the smallest in the county. It lies in the Ruth Valley south of Ruth Lake. The economy centers on Ruth Lake and the tourism attracted by it. Businesses include a church, a cafe, and many resorts and campgrounds.
Salyer is on the western edge of Trinity County, along the Trinity River where it is joined by the South Fork. It was defined as a CDP for the 2020 census.
Trinity Center is the largest community on Trinity Lake, which brings in tourism and sustains the economy of the town. It used to lie at the bottom of a valley that was flooded by Trinity Lake in the 1950s, when it was moved to its current location along with several historic buildings. It is home to the busiest airport in the county. 
Trinity Village locally known as Hawkins Bar, is a community in the Downriver area. The only non-accommodation business is a bar and grill. Its economy is based on recreation on the Trinity River.  
Weaverville is the county seat and by far the largest community in the county. It is nestled along Weaver Creek in the Weaver Basin along Highway 299. It got its beginnings as a Gold Rush town, and there are still many historic buildings, including several of the oldest brick buildings in the state and the oldest county courthouse. There was a thriving Chinese community at the height of the Gold Rush, and a state park today houses the oldest Taoist temple in the state, the Joss House.

Unincorporated communities

Big Bar
Del Loma
Denny
Forest Glen
Hawkins Bar
Peanut
Zenia

Former cities/towns/communities

Education
K-12 school districts include:

Unified:

 Klamath-Trinity Joint Unified School District
 Mountain Valley Unified School District
 Southern Trinity Joint Unified School District
 Trinity Alps Unified School District - Serves some areas for PK-12 and others only for grades 9-12

Elementary:

 Burnt Ranch Elementary School District
 Coffee Creek Elementary School District
 Douglas City Elementary School District
 Junction City Elementary School District
 Lewiston Elementary School District
 Trinity Center Elementary School District

Population ranking

The population ranking of the following table is based on the 2020 census of Trinity County.

† county seat

See also 
 Hiking trails in Trinity County
National Register of Historic Places listings in Trinity County, California
Trinity Lakes American Viticultural Area
Willow Creek American Viticultural Area

Notes

References

External links

VisitTrinity: Visitors Bureau
Trinity County Chamber Of Commerce
  Tsnungwe Official Website

 

 
California counties
Shasta Cascade
1850 establishments in California
Populated places established in 1850
Articles containing video clips